Kachess River is a tributary of the Yakima River, in the U.S. state of Washington. From its source on Chickamin Ridge in the Alpine Lakes Wilderness region of the Cascade Range, the Kachess River flows south into Kachess Lake, a natural lake regulated as a reservoir by Kachess Dam. Below the dam, the Kachess River flows south and then empties into the Yakima River at Lake Easton.

See also
List of rivers of Washington
List of tributaries of the Columbia River

References

External links
 Yakima Project, United States Bureau of Reclamation

Rivers of Washington (state)
Rivers of Kittitas County, Washington
Tributaries of the Yakima River